The 1999 Campeonato Brasileiro Série A was the 43rd edition of the Campeonato Brasileiro Série A.

Overview
It was contested by 22 teams, and Corinthians won the championship.

First phase

Final standings

Top scorers

Relegation
The criterion for relegation to the Série B in 1999 was the average of points obtained in 1999 and 1998. The four teams with the smallest averages would be relegated. The CBF-defined formula for the point average (PA) was:

PA = ( (P98/23) + (P99/21) ) / 2

P98 being the number of points in 1998 and P99 the number of points in 1999.

As to Gama and Botafogo-SP, that had ascended from the Série B and as such, didn't dispute the 1998 Série A, the formula was reduced to:

PA = P99/21

Originally, the six worst point averages were:

 Gama: 1,238
 Internacional: 1,219
 Botafogo: 1,178
 Paraná: 1,093
 Juventude: 1,089
 Botafogo/SP: 1,000

Which would mean that Botafogo, Paraná, Juventude and Botafogo-SP would be relegated. However, the matches of São Paulo against Internacional and Botafogo were annulled and the points gained by São Paulo in both matches (three against Botafogo, one against Internacional) were given to both clubs, due to the fielding of the ineligible player Sandro Hiroshi in both matches. So, the six worst point averages became:

 Internacional: 1,267
 Botafogo: 1,249
 Gama: 1,238
 Paraná: 1,093
 Juventude: 1,089
 Botafogo/SP: 1,000

This meant that Botafogo escaped from relegation and Gama joined Botafogo/SP, Juventude and Paraná in the Série B em 2000.

Gama didn't accept this decision and appealed. The judicial disputes lasted months and CBF was stopped from organizing the 2000 Campeonato Brasileiro. The Clube dos 13 assumed the organization of the championship, that was named Copa João Havelange, with the participation of 116 teams divided em 3 groups.

References

1
1999